Chris Searle (born 1 January 1944) is a British educator, poet, anti-racist activist and socialist. He has written widely on cricket, language, jazz, race and social justice, and has taught in Canada, England, Tobago, Mozambique and Grenada. He has been associated with the Institute of Race Relations since the 1970s, and is on the editorial board of Race & Class. He writes a weekly column on jazz for the left-wing newspaper Morning Star.

Life

Chris Searle was born in Romford, Essex, in 1944. He was a young cricketer for England, and graduated in 1966 from the University of Leeds. That year he went to Hamilton, Ontario, Canada, where in 1967 he completed an M.A. in English Literature at McMaster University, which included a thesis on the East End of London poet Isaac Rosenberg. He became a schoolteacher in Canada, and then in 1968–69 taught English at a secondary school in Tobago, in the West Indies. His 1972 work The Forsaken Lover: White Words and Black People, which won the Martin Luther King Prize, is based on his experience in Tobago.

Stepney School strike
On returning to England in 1970, Searle taught in the East End, and was involved in the Stepney School strike of 1971 in the borough of Tower Hamlets. He was dismissed from the John Cass Foundation and Red Coat School when he published Stepney Words, a collection of his pupils' poems; however, he was reinstated after his pupils went on strike in protest.

Later life
He spent 1977 and 1978 working in Nampula Secondary School in northern Mozambique during the Civil War. His book We're Building the New School! Diary of a Teacher in Mozambique, published in 1981, presents his experiences in diary form.

Searle spent time in the early 1980s in Grenada, and wrote and edited several books about that Caribbean island, including, in 1981, Grenada: Education Is a Must! with Grenada's Prime Minister Maurice Bishop. Bishop had been involved in March 1979 with a coup by the Marxist New Jewel Movement, which suspended the country's constitution, and established a People's Revolutionary Government. Searle also edited In Nobody's Backyard: Maurice Bishop’s speeches 1979–1983.

He taught at the Earl Marshal School in Sheffield between 1990 and 1995. Later he was a lecturer in education at Goldsmiths College, London. In 2007, Searle was a visiting social sciences professor at York University, Toronto.

According to John Berger: "At his best Searle's compassion, anger and sense of historical morality as a storyteller are reminiscent of the early Gorki. I can see no other writer in Britain with whom to compare him."

Bibliography 

Stepney Words (editor), 1971
Firewords (editor), 1971 – a national anthology of children's poetry
Poilu: a novel, 1971
Elders: a collection of poems by elder citizens (editor), 1972
The Forsaken Lover: White Words and Black People, Routledge & Kegan Paul, 1972 (Penguin Books, 1973)
This New Season: Our Class, Our Schools, Our World, 1973
Mainland, 1973 – poems
Ferndale Fires: a children's story, 1974
Classrooms of Resistance, Writers and Readers, 1975
The Black Man of Shadwell: four stories, 1976
The World in a Classroom, 1977
Beyond the Skin: How Mozambique is defeating racism, 1979
Grenada: "Let those who labour hold the reins", 1979 – interview with Bernard Coard
Red Earth: Poems, 1980
Tales of Mozambique (with Chaz Davies and Ruhi Hamid), 1980 
Bricklight: Poems from the Labour Movement in East London (editor), 1980
Grenada: Education Is a Must! (with Maurice Bishop), 1981Is Freedom We Making': The New Democracy in Grenada (editor), 1981
We're Building the New School! Diary of a Teacher in Mozambique, Zed Books, 1981 
Sunflower of Hope: Poems from the Mozambican Revolution (editor), Allison and Busby, 1982
Grenada Is Not Alone (editor), 1982
In the Spirit of Butler: trade unionism in free Grenada (editor), 1982
In the Mainstream of the Revolution (editor), 1982
To Construct From Morning: making the people’s budget in Grenada (editor), 1982
Common Ground, 1983
Grenada: The Struggle against Destabilization, 1983
Wheel Around the World (editor), 1983
Words Unchained: Language and Revolution in Grenada, 1984
In Nobody’s Backyard: Maurice Bishop’s speeches 1979–1983 (editor), Zed Books, 1984
Calalloo: Stories from Grenada (editor), 1984
Our City (editor), 1984
All Our Words, 1986
Poems for Peace by Sheffield Schoolchildren (editor), 1987
Children of Steel: A Sheffield Anthology (editor), 1988
Racism and the Press in Thatcher's Britain (with Nancy Murray), Institute of Race Relations, 1989
Your Daily Dose: Racism and the Sun, 1989
Grenada Morning: a memoir of the revo, Karia Press, 1989
One for Blair (editor), 1989 – tribute to Blair Peach
Remember Hillsborough: a memorial anthology (co-editor, with Steve Chew), 1990
Freedom Children: a tribute in poetry to the children of South Africa from the children of Sheffield (editor), 1990
A Blindfold Removed: Ethiopia's Struggle for Literacy, 1991
Outcast England: How schools exclude black children (with Jenny Bourne and Lee Bridges), 1994
Living Community, Living School: Essays on education in British inner cities, 1997 
Changing Literacies (with Colin Lankshear, James Paul Gee and Michele Knobel), 1997
None But Our Words: Critical Literacy in Classroom and Community, 1998
Pitch of Life: Writings on Cricket, Parrs Wood Press, 2001
An Exclusive Education: Race, Class and Exclusion in British Schools, 2002
Lightning of Your Eyes: new and selected poems, Smokestack Books, 2006
Cosmopolis Toronto (editor), 2007
Tell It Like It Is: How our schools fail black children (with Bernard Coard and others), 2007
Forward Groove: Jazz and the Real World from Louis Armstrong to Gilad Atzman, Northway Publications, 2008
Toronto Generations (editor), 2008
Mandela, Manchester (editor), 2009
Doodlebug Boy, 2011
Red Groove, Five Leaves Publications, 2013
Footprints: Poems by Peter Blackman (editor), Smokestack Books, 2013

References

External links
Chris Searle: The Great Includer, October 2009. Special issue of Race and Class, a festschrift on his 65th birthday.
"The Stepney School Strike of 1971", Spitalfields Life, 16 August 2011.
Michael h Baldwin, " Tales for Perspiring Teachers. Chapter 2. Revolution in the air" - In which 900 children go on strike and march to Trafalgar Square.
Fran Abrams, "Sacked radical head doomed to repeat the lessons of history", The Independent, 31 December 1995
"Former head chronicles a passion for jazz and justice" (interview), Sheffield Telegraph, 14 November 2008.

1944 births
Living people
Alumni of the University of Leeds
British poets
British educational theorists
British socialists
British activists
People from Romford
British male poets
20th-century British male writers
21st-century British male writers